Valerie A. Arkoosh is an American anesthesiologist, politician, and academic. She is currently the Acting Secretary of the Pennsylvania Department of Human Services. Arkoosh was formerly the chair of the Montgomery County Board of Commissioners and the first female chair.

Early life and education 
Arkoosh earned a Bachelor of Arts degree in economics from Northwestern University in 1982. She earned a Doctor of Medicine from the University of Nebraska Medical Center in 1986, a earned a Master of Public Health from Johns Hopkins University in 2007. Arkoosh is an anesthesiologist. She performed her residency at Jefferson Medical College in Anesthesiology, with a focus on obstetrics.

Academic career 
Arkoosh was a professor of clinical anesthesiology and clinical obstetrics and gynecology at the Perelman School of Medicine at the University of Pennsylvania. From 1999 to 2004, she was chair of the department of anesthesiology at the Drexel University College of Medicine. She also taught at Sidney Kimmel Medical College.

In 2007, Arkoosh joined the board of the National Physicians Alliance. She served as its president from 2010 to 2012.

Political career 
Arkoosh ran for Congress in 2014 for Pennsylvania's 13th congressional district when Congresswoman Allyson Schwartz vacated the seat to run for Governor. Arkoosh was unsuccessful in the Democratic primary.

Montgomery County commissioner 
Arkoosh was appointed to the Montgomery County Board of Commissioners in January 2015, filing a vacancy left by Leslie Richards, who left her position after being confirmed as Secretary of the Pennsylvania Department of Transportation (and who currently serves as General Manager of SEPTA). She won a four-year term in November 2015, earning 28.27% of the vote, and again in 2019. In 2016, she was unanimously elected to serve as chair of the Montgomery County Board of Commissioners. Arkoosh was the vice chair until she was elected as chair. Montgomery County, Pennsylvania is located in southeast Pennsylvania and is the third most populous county in the Commonwealth of Pennsylvania. She was preceded by Josh Shapiro, who stepped down to become attorney general. She is the first woman to Chair the Montgomery County Board of Commissioners. In 2019, she won re-election to a second four-year term, earning 32.29% of the vote. 

According to Montgomery County, the “Board of Commissioners oversees a budget of $400 million and directs more than 2,400 employees. The Commission manages human services for more than 100,000 residents, the county court and criminal justice system, Voter Services, over 130 county bridges, 75 miles of roads and other infrastructure, seven county parks and nearly 100 miles of trails.”

Arkoosh's resigned from the Montgomery County Commission on January 17, 2023.

2022 U.S. Senate campaign 
On April 5, 2021, Arkoosh launched her campaign for the Democratic nomination for the 2022 United States Senate election in Pennsylvania and filed a statement of candidacy with the Federal Election Commission. She ran for the open seat left by U.S. Senator Pat Toomey, who is retiring. Arkoosh dropped out of the race in February 2022.

Secretary of Pennsylvania Department of Human Services 
In January 2023, Arkoosh was nominated by governor-elect Josh Shapiro to serve as secretary of the Pennsylvania Department of Human Services.

Personal life 
Arkoosh lives in Springfield Township, Montgomery County, Pennsylvania, with her husband, Jeff Harbison. She has 3 children.

Electoral history

References

External links

1960 births
21st-century American politicians
21st-century American women politicians
Candidates in the 2014 United States elections
Living people
Montgomery County Commissioners (Pennsylvania)
Pennsylvania Democrats
People from Springfield Township, Montgomery County, Pennsylvania
Women in Pennsylvania politics
State cabinet secretaries of Pennsylvania
21st-century American women physicians
21st-century American physicians
Physicians from Pennsylvania
American anesthesiologists
Year of birth missing (living people)
Women anesthesiologists